Moses Martin was an American farmer, A.M.E. Church organizer, county commissioner, elections commissioner, and state legislator in South Carolina. He represented Fairfield County, South Carolina in the South Carolina Senate. He helped found White Hall A.M.E. Church in Jenkinsville.

Martin was enslaved from the time of his birth in South Carolina. He was documented as being "mulatto".

He submitted his resignation as county commissioner in 1871 after receiving a death threat from the Ku Klux Klan, but South Carolina governor Robert Kingston Scott refused to accept it.

In 2020, descendants of Martin were among those who gathered at the White Hall Church for a Black History Month celebration and campaign rally for U.S. presidential candidate Bernie Sanders.

See also
African-American officeholders during and following the Reconstruction era

References

Year of birth missing
Year of death missing
Farmers from South Carolina
South Carolina state senators